The Ancient Theatre of Fourvière is a Roman theatre in Lyon, France. It was built on the hill of Fourvière, which is located in the center of the Roman city. The theatre is part of a UNESCO World Heritage Site protecting the historic center of Lyon.

Chronology 
The theatre was built in two steps: around 15 BC, a theatre with a 90 m diameter was built next to the hill. At the beginning of the 2nd century, the final construction added a last place for the audience. The diameter is 108 m, and there were seats for 10,000 people.

Today the theatre is primarily a tourist site, but it is still used as a cultural venue. Each year, the Nuits de Fourvière festival takes place in the theatre.

See also

 Odeon of Lyon
 List of Roman theatres

References

5th arrondissement of Lyon
Fourviere
Roman Lyon
Buildings and structures in Lyon
Tourist attractions in Lyon
Ruins in Auvergne-Rhône-Alpes